Turkish Maritime Organization is a state-owned company responsible for the operation of certain harbor and shipyards in Turkey. Its headquarters is located in Karaköy quarter of Beyoğlu district, Istanbul.

The precursor of the company was founded in 1843 during the Ottoman Empire era. The company was responsible only  for the ports around İstanbul. In 1933, following the establishment of the Turkish Republic, the company was divided into three subcompanies; one for İstanbul, one for the other ports in Turkey and one for the shipyards.  In 1938, DenizBank, then a state-owned bank, was founded to support the maritime business.  However, in 1997 most of the harbors as well as the bank were privatised.

Presently, the harbors owned by the company are as follows:
Sarayburnu (İstanbul, European side)
Kuruçeşme (İstanbul, European side)
Kabatepe (Çanakkale Province)
Gökçeada-Kuzu (Çanakkale Province Gökçeada island )
Güllük (Muğla Province)
Paşalimanı (Balıkesir Province)
Taşucu (Mersin Province)

References

Transport companies established in 1843
Companies based in Istanbul
Port operating companies
1843 establishments in the Ottoman Empire
Beyoğlu
Government-owned companies of Turkey
Transport companies of Turkey